is a railway station located in Kagoshima, Kagoshima, Japan. The station opened in 1934.

Lines 
Kyushu Railway Company
Ibusuki Makurazaki Line

JR

Adjacent stations

Nearby places
National Route 226
Kagoshima City Sesekushi Elementary School
Sesekushi Post office

Railway stations in Kagoshima Prefecture
Railway stations in Japan opened in 1934